EGPS ( EGPS, EGPS, trademarked as eGPS) is a technology designed for mobile phones on GSM and W-CDMA networks, to augment GPS signals to deliver faster location fixes, lower cost implementations and reduced power and processing requirements. It is being developed by CSR who has partnered with Motorola – together they intend to create an open industry forum.

According to CSR, EGPS delivers a "universal positioning capability that will not only work reliably indoors and in zero GPS signal conditions, but greatly speed time to fix in poor GPS reception areas where most handsets are used." More specifically, it can "exploit data available from the cellular network to speed GPS fixes and provide complementary, fast, and reliable location sensing when GPS signals are weak or unavailable." CSR is hoping to add eGPS capabilities to handsets for less than $1 per unit.

E-GPS combines CSR's "Matrix" technology with GPS – when a user initiates a location request they get a Matrix location instantly using cell tower information, accurate to within 100m.  Then CSR's "Fine Time Aiding" helps the device know where to look for a GPS signal, to quickly acquire satellite information within seconds. Fine Time Aiding enables a more aggressive search and is claimed to be equivalent to 6 dB more sensitivity than can be achieved by any GPS hardware correlator in the terminal.

CSR claim that this enables software-only GPS solutions to operate reliably in all environments, and that eGPS is superior to Assisted GPS. EGPS technologies are due in 2008.

eGPS is much advanced than conventional GPS system provided with enhanced location search and integrated cellular connectivity.2;EGPS-English,Grammar,Puntunation,Spelling

Timeline 
 February 2005 - The E-GPS system was first announced by developers CPS (Cambridge Positioning Systems Ltd)
 January 2007 - CPS is purchased by CSR, a manufacturer of bluetooth and wireless chips for mobile handsets
 January 2008 - CSR & Motorola announce that they intend to create an open industry forum for EGPS technologies

References

External links 
 The EGPS Forum - Motorola and CSR
 CSR shows off eGPS, says it's superior to aGPS
  E-GPS High Accuracy Mobile Location Technology for GSM / 3G W-CDMA

Mobile technology
Global Positioning System